Viktor Grigoryevich Shuvalov (15 December 1923 – 19 April 2021) was an ice hockey player who played in the Soviet Hockey League. He was born in the Republic of Mordovia, Russian SFSR, Soviet Union.

Biography
He was born in the Republic of Mordovia; sources vary on whether his birthplace was Nabornye Syresi or Ruzayevka.

He played for HC CSKA Moscow.  He was inducted into the Russian and Soviet Hockey Hall of Fame in 1953. He also played soccer in the Soviet Top League for VVS Moscow from 1950 to 1952.

Shuvalov died from COVID-19 in Moscow on 19 April 2021, at the age of 97, amid the COVID-19 pandemic in Russia.

References

External links
Russian and Soviet Hockey Hall of Fame bio
Viktor Shuvalov, Australian Broadcasting Corporation
 History of Russian Ice Hockey
Viktor Shuvalov's profile at Sports Reference.com
Soviet trailblazer Shuvalov dies

1923 births
2021 deaths
Association footballers not categorized by position
HC CSKA Moscow players
Ice hockey players at the 1956 Winter Olympics
Medalists at the 1956 Winter Olympics
Olympic gold medalists for the Soviet Union
Olympic ice hockey players of the Soviet Union
Olympic medalists in ice hockey
People from Ardatovsky Uyezd (Simbirsk Governorate)
People from Mordovia
Soviet footballers
Honoured Masters of Sport of the USSR
Russian State University of Physical Education, Sport, Youth and Tourism alumni
Soviet ice hockey coaches
Recipients of the Order "For Merit to the Fatherland", 4th class
Deaths from the COVID-19 pandemic in Russia
Sportspeople from Mordovia